Casapulla is a comune (municipality) in the Province of Caserta in the Italian region Campania, located about  west of Caserta.

Casapulla borders the municipalities of Casagiove, Curti, Macerata Campania, Recale, and San Prisco.

References

Cities and towns in Campania